Magelang is a regency in Central Java, Indonesia, famous for its 9th century Buddhist temple of Borobudur. Its capital is Mungkid. It covers an area of 1,085.73 km2 and had a population of 1,181,723 at the 2010 Census and 1,299,859 at the 2020 Census. These figures exclude the autonomous city of Magelang, which is separately administered but is geographically enclaved within the regency, which borders Temanggung Regency to the north, Semarang Regency to the northeast, Boyolali Regency to the east, the Special Region of Yogyakarta to the south and southeast, Purworejo Regency to the southwest, and Wonosobo Regency to the west. Its motto is Magelang Gemilang (Shining Magelang).

History 
The history of this regency is tied with the history of the city of Magelang. In 1812, Lieutenant-Governor Sir Thomas Stamford Raffles appointed Ngabel Danuningrat as the first regent of Magelang. This was a consequence of a treaty between England and Yogyakarta Sultanate on 1 August 1812 that hands over control of the Kedu region to England. As directed by his teacher, he chose an area between the Mantiasih and Gelangan village as the capital.

In 1930, a new regent was appointed, named Ngabei Danukusumo, replacing the Danuningrat dynasty who held the regent position before, and Magelang became a gemeente, together with the city of Semarang, Salatiga, and Pekalongan. The mayor position was only appointed in 1924. But, the city of Magelang was still the office of the regent. As a result, there are several regional leaders in the city of Magelang.

In 1948, the position of the regency was strengthened through UU No. 2 1948, with Magelang City being the capital. In 1950, based on UU No. 13 1950, the city was declared independent of the regency and given the right to manage its own matters, so there was a need to move the capital. There were two contenders for the capital city of Magelang Regency, namely Grabag and Muntilan, but they were rejected. On 22 March 1984, the southern Mertoyudan district and the northern Mungkid district were officially chosen as the capital by the governor of Central Java, under the name of Mungkid City.

Geography 
Magelang Regency is located at a plateau, which is shaped like a basin, surrounded by mountains, such as Mount Merbabu and Mount Merapi. Many water sources originate from the mountains. Progo River and Elo River passes through the regency. Most of the area in the regency is either hilly or steep, with little flat area.

Geology 
The southwestern part of the regency (Salaman and southern Borobudur district) has breccia, andesite, dacites, tuffs, and agglomerate stones, which are part of the Old Andesite Formation. Rocks from volcanoes around the regency form the Magelang plain as fertile alluvial sediment soil. In the middle of the regency, the ground is made of sediment/alluvial soil, which is weathered from rocks. Meanwhile, the ground in the slopes and foothills of the mountains are from volcanic sediments.

Climate 

Administrative districts 
Magelang Regency is divided into twenty-one districts (kecamatan), subdivided into 367 rural villages (desa), and five urban villages (kelurahan). The districts are tabulated below with their areas and their populations at the 2010 Census and the 2020 Census.

Demographics 

Magelang Regency had a population of 1,299,859 at the 2020 Census, which is an increase of 55,301 since the 2015 census. The gender ratio in 2020 was 101.57 (males per 100 females).

References